The pectorals of ancient Egypt were a form of jewelry, often represented as a brooch. These were mostly worn by richer people and the pharaoh.

One type is attached with a nah  necklace, meant to be suspended from the neck but to lie upon the breast. Statuary from the Old Kingdom onwards shows this form.

A later form was attached as a brooch, with the thematic, iconographic function and statement outweighing its actual use as a piece of jewellery for adornment. The thematic statements were typically about the pharaoh or statements of ancient Egyptian mythology and culture.  They are usually of gold with cloisonné inlays of gemstones.

Ancient Egyptian definition of pectoral
The many determinatives for pectoral are not portrayed in the Gardiner's Sign List. However, one of the 10 words for 'pectoral', or 'collar' uses the Usekh collar determinative, S11, the "collar necklace" S11. However a similar hieroglyph for the verb "to collar", "to net" shows the relationship between the two Gardiner-listed hieroglyphs T24.

The basic definition of a brooch is as a wide piece of jewellery. Therefore, one form of the 'pectoral' word listings uses the word for "breadth, broad", "to be wide or spacious", the Egyptian word usekh. (Cf. Usekh collar.)

Pectoral determinatives
Though Gardiner lists only the "broad collar", S11, the following listing of words for "pectoral" shows the other types of pectoral jewellery forms that have a Gardiner-unlisted type of pectoral hieroglyph sign:

The list of Gardiner-unlisted determinatives for pectoral:

ari aui-(none) (bracelets, armlets)
usekh-(Gard-unl. 1 to 7) (8 is the S11 collar)
utcha-(Gard-unl. 9 to 12) (12 has beads)
babaa-{Gard-unl. 13) ('necklace of beads', pectoral)
beb-{Gard-unl. 13) (a metal pectoral or breastplate, collar) (uraeus headdress (?))
menqebit-(none) (collar or pectoral to which the serpent amulet was attached)
hebner-{Gard-unl. 2 (similar to collar S11)) (collar, pectoral, neckband)
heter-t-(none) (a pectoral, a pectoral amulet)

hkakerit-(Gard. Aa30-used horizontally)Aa30(ornaments, collar, pectoral, head-attire)
sheb-{Gard-unl. 15) (collar, necklace, pectoral)

'None' may have an alternate determinative used to define the word. From the above definitions, it can be seen that the collar, neckband, pectoral, beads, etc., can also include amulets inclusive into the pectoral's iconography. The above listed words are refenced in E. A. Wallis Budge's "dictionary" to 200 works: steles, papyri, Egyptian literature, personal literature, etc., or the approximate 120 authors referenced.

Statuary with pectorals

Standing statues, or others were sometimes represented with various forms of jewellery, including the pectorals; some are enigmatic in what is being portrayed, whether to gods, or what the symbolism represents.

Famous pectorals; hieroglyph statements

Statements in Egyptian language hieroglyphs were often the theme of famous pectorals, regardless of their actual use for adornment.

One famous complex pectoral for Amenemhat III has a statement of his rulership. The Pectoral of Amenemhat III states the following:

Lord (of) Heaven, God-Good, Lord of the Two Lands, 'Ny-Maat-Ra', Lord (of all) Lands.
pt-nb, ntr-nft, nb-tawy, n-maat-a-t-Ra, nb-hastw. ('Ny-Maat-Ra' is Amenemhat III's prenomen name.)

Kamrin's modern hieroglyph primer for Egyptian artifacts uses Amenemhat III's pectoral for Exercise 22, Object 3. The discussion explains that the extended wings of the Vulture Goddess relate to "Lord of the Sky"-(pt), the Vulture Goddess, (but also implying the pharaoh is Lord of the Sky). Her translation: "Lord (Lady) of the sky Nimaatre (Amenemhat III), the good god, lord of the Two Lands and of all foreign Lands." (nb pt n-m3't-r' nthr nfr nb t3wy h3swt nb(w)t)

"Pectorals as a brooch" gallery

"Pectorals as necklace" gallery

See also
Gardiner's Sign List#S. Crowns, Dress, Staves, etc.
Gardiner's Sign List
List of ancient Egyptian statuary with amulet necklaces, (section Pectoral Necklace)
Gorget

Notes

References

Budge. An Egyptian Hieroglyphic Dictionary, E.A.Wallace Budge, (Dover Publications), © 1978, (© 1920), Dover edition, 1978. (In two volumes, 1314 pages.) (softcover)
Kamrin, 2004. Ancient Egyptian Hieroglyphs: A Practical Guide, Janice Kamrin, © 2004, Harry N. Abrams, Publisher, (Photos or graphics of 73 Ancient Egyptian objects analyzed-(Exercises-(51), Objects)) (hardcover)
Lambelet. Orbis Terrae Aegiptiae, Museum Aegiptium, Illustrated Guide of the Egyptian Museum'', Edouard Lambelet, © 1981, Lehnert & Landrock & Co. (no ISBN)

Brooches
Egyptian artefact types
Necklaces
Types of jewellery